Hells Gate Moraine is a glacial moraine at the head of Evans Cove on the coast of Victoria Land, Antarctica. It extends southward to Hells Gate from nearby Vegetation Island and Cape Confusion.

History
The moraine was mapped and named by the Northern Party of the British Terra Nova Expedition (1910–13), in association with Hells Gate.

Historic site
On 25 January 1913 The Terra Nova expedition established an emergency depot at the moraine consisting of a sled loaded with supplies and equipment. Although the sled and its contents were removed in 1994 in order to stabilise their deteriorating condition, the site has been designated a Historic Site or Monument (HSM 68), following a proposal by New Zealand, Norway and the United Kingdom to the Antarctic Treaty Consultative Meeting.

References

Moraines of the Ross Dependency
Landforms of Victoria Land
Scott Coast
Historic Sites and Monuments of Antarctica